The Black Weblog Awards was an online awards event which recognizes bloggers of African-American descent for their contributions in blogging, video blogging, and podcasting. The Black Weblog Awards started in 2005 with 11 categories, and grew to include 36 categories. Former Black Weblog Award winners include blogger and radio host B. Scott, comedian and YouTube personality Elon James White, comedian, television host, and New York Times best-selling author Baratunde Thurston, LGBT activist and media personality Keith Boykin, hip-hop artists D-Nice and Kanye West, musician and DJ Questlove, and model/media personality Tyra Banks. Other Black Weblog Award winners have also appeared in traditional media outlets, such as The Washington Post, the Los Angeles Times, and NPR.

The 2015 winners were presented at the final ceremony in 2016.

Nominations and voting
The Black Weblog Awards had a seven-week nomination period for blogs; users submit their blog for consideration through the Black Weblog Awards website via their online nomination form. After the nomination period has ended, there is a vote audit, and the top three to five nominated blogs in each category become the finalists for their respective categories. The public has a month to vote for the finalists, and the winners are announced the first week of September before Labor Day.

Judges
In 2007, judges were introduced to the Black Weblog Awards. In addition to the regular voting process from the public, a panel of judges with extensive knowledge about blogs and bloggers of color were chosen to select winners in each of the award categories. Each category has two winners—one winner is chosen by the public (known as the "Popular Vote"), and one winner is chosen by the judges (known as the "Judges' Vote"). These winners are announced the first week of September before Labor Day.

Award categories
Award categories for the Black Weblog Awards changed annually. Some categories were renamed, while others split to become separate categories.

Awards 
 Best Blog Design
 Best Blog Network
 Best Blog Post Series
 Best Business Blog
 Best Cooking or Food Blog
 Best Culture Blog
 Best Faith-Based Blog
 Best Fashion or Beauty Blog
 Best Film Blog
 Best Gaming or Comics Blog
 Best Gossip Blog
 Best Group Blog
 Best Health or Wellness Blog
 Best Hip-Hop Blog
 Best Humor Blog
 Best International Blog
 Best LGBT Blog
 Best Microblog
 Best Music Blog
 Best New Blog
 Best Parenting or Family Blog
 Best Personal Blog
 Best Photography Blog
 Best Podcast Series
 Best Political or News Blog
 Best Science or Technology Blog
 Best Sex or Relationships Blog
 Best Sports Blog
 Best Teen Blog
 Best Travel Blog
 Best Video Blog Series
 Best Writing in a Blog
 Blog of the Year
 Blog to Watch

Special awards 
 Aaron Hawkins Award

Retired or deprecated awards 
 Best Blog Community
 Best Blog Post or Blog Post Series
 Best Celebrity Blog
 Best Entertainment Blog
 Best Niche Blog
 Best Original Content
 Best Pop Culture Blog
 Best Topical Blog
 Blogger of the Year

Live awards ceremony
On July 18, 2010, the Black Weblog Awards announced a Kickstarter fund-raising campaign for financial support in establishing a live awards ceremony for their 2011 awards installment. The campaign was not successful, and ended on September 1, 2010 reaching only 6% of their goal.

New ownership
In 2011, Black Web 2.0 reported that the Black Weblog Awards was acquired from Atlanta-based media company 3eighteen media by GEMPIRE Interactive headquartered in Austin, Texas.

See also

Blog award

References

External links
 Black Weblog Awards
 2010 Black Weblog Awards Winners
 2009 Black Weblog Awards Winners
 2008 Black Weblog Awards Winners
 2007 Black Weblog Awards Winners
 2006 Black Weblog Awards Winners
 2005 Black Weblog Awards Winners

Blog awards
African-American blogs